Newark Castle may refer to:
Newark Castle, Fife, Scotland
Newark Castle, Nottinghamshire, England
Newark Castle railway station, Nottinghamshire
Newark Castle, Port Glasgow, Inverclyde, Scotland
Newark Castle, Selkirkshire, Scotland
Newark Castle, South Ayrshire, Scotland